Protolira thorvaldssoni is a species of sea snail, a marine gastropod mollusk in the family Skeneidae.

Description
The shell attains a diameter of 2.5 mm.

Distribution
This species occurs along the Mid-Atlantic Ridge off southwestern Iceland found on decaying whalebone at a depth of a few hundred metres.

References

 Warén A., 1996: New and little known mollusca from Iceland and Scandinavia. Part 3 ; Sarsia 81: 197–245

External links

thorvaldssoni
Gastropods described in 1996